MV Tassie III (S-77) was a 120-ton steel motor vessel, which was requisitioned by the United States Army during the Second World War. She was carrying 80 tons of condemned ammunition when she was wrecked  while sheltering at the jetty at Byron Bay, New South Wales, Australia, on 9 June 1945.

The Australian salvage tug Tancred salvaged most of the ammunition from the wreck in 1946.

Notes

 

Shipwrecks of the Richmond-Tweed Region
Maritime incidents in June 1945
1945 in Australia